The Dornier Do R Superwal was a German flying boat airliner of the 1920s.

Development
The Do R was a larger development of the Do J, with a larger high-mounted strut-braced monoplane wing and longer fuselage. All but the first three built also had four engines, in place of the Do J's two. The Do R could carry 19 passengers in two cabins; 11 in the forward cabin and eight in the rear.

Dornier R 2 Superwal 
The first R 2 Superwal, (D-1115), made its maiden flight on 30 September 1926.  Two 650 hp Rolls-Royce Condor III engines were mounted in tandem in a nacelle above the wing and in line with the hull; one engine drove a tractor propeller and the other drove a pusher propeller. D-1115 was the largest flying boat that could be built in the postwar Dornier factory in Manzell.  The Superwal went into service with Severa and later DVS in List, both organisations of the German government, tasked to develop military seaplanes, ignoring restrictions of the Versailles treaty.  Two more R 2 Superwals were built in 1927 for Severa (D-1255 and D-1385).  D-1255 was periodically operated by Deutsche Luft Hansa and was named Narwal.  D-1385 was equipped with 800 hp Packard engines, and remained in service until November 1936.

Dornier R 4 Superwal 
Between 20 January and 5 February 1927 Dornier Chief Pilot Richard Wagner established twelve world records for seaplanes with a new R4 Gas Superwal.  This aircraft and eleven more with Gnome et Rhône Bristol-Jupiter engines (R4 Gas) or 525 hp Siemens-Bristol-Jupiter engines (R4 Sas) were delivered to the Italian airline Società Anonima Navigazione Aerea (SANA) and Luft Hansa during 1928 and ‘29.
Apart from their use by Luft Hansa, six Superwals saw regular service with SANA into the early 1930s on a route along the Italian west coast and on to Spain.  Three aircraft were lost during their service.  The Superwal I-RUDO (equipped with Isotta Fraschini Asso 500 engines) went into service with the Italian Air Ministry in 1934 and became the last Superwal in Italian service.
At least one aircraft was assembled in Spain by CASA.

Variants
R2 - early version with two Rolls-Royce Condor III inline engines (three built)
R4 - definitive version with four engines in two tractor-pusher pairs
R4 Gas - with Gnome et Rhône-built Bristol Jupiter radial engines (two built)
R4 Nas - with Napier Lion inlines (two built)
R4 Sas - with Siemens-built Bristol Jupiter radials (ten built)
R4 Cas - with Pratt & Whitney Hornet radials (two built)

Operators

SANA

 Aviación Militar Española 

Deutsche Luft Hansa

Specifications (R4Gas)

References

External links

German aircraft between 1919 - 1945
Planes Planned For TransAtlantic Service article on Dornier R 2 Superwal September 1927 Popular Mechanics

Do R
1920s German airliners
Flying boats
Four-engined push-pull aircraft
High-wing aircraft
Aircraft first flown in 1926